Victor Florent Dubois (12 March 1906 – 18 December 1987) was a Progressive Conservative party member of the House of Commons of Canada. Born in Saint-Paul-de-Chester, Quebec, he was a manager and merchant by career.

He was first elected at the Richmond—Wolfe riding in the 1958 general election. Dubois served one term, the 24th Canadian Parliament, until he was defeated in the 1962 election by André Bernier of the Social Credit party. Dubois made another attempt to win the riding in the 1963 election but lost again. He made no further federal election attempts after this.

External links

Florent Dubois at Genealogy of Canada

1906 births
1987 deaths
Members of the House of Commons of Canada from Quebec
Progressive Conservative Party of Canada MPs
People from Centre-du-Québec